"Democracy Manifest" (also known as "Succulent Chinese Meal", among other names) is an October 1991 Australian news segment video by reporter Chris Reason. It is "one of Australia's most viral videos", according to Sportsbet. The Guardian, in 2019, called it "perhaps the pre-eminent Australian meme of the past 10 years". YouTube has several postings of the video with more than a million views each.

It features a man who is being arrested at a Fortitude Valley Chinese restaurant. Wrestled into a police car, he speaks with the commanding voice of a trained stage actor. As the police fumble, he exclaims various seemingly non sequiturs such as "This is Democracy Manifest!", "Get your hand off my penis!", "What is the charge? Eating a meal? A succulent Chinese meal?", and "I see that you know your judo well."

The video was made on 11 October 1991, but it was not uploaded to the Internet until 2009. A mystery developed about who the man was, with theories centring on Hungarian chess player Paul Charles Dozsa known for his dine-and-dash exploits. In 2020, an aging Australian man, later identified as Cecil George Edwards, appeared in a music video by an Australian punk rock band, The Chats, revealed himself as the man in the now-viral 1991 video. Edwards, who had been a serial prison escapee, was arrested for alleged credit card fraud by the Queensland Police Service, after being wrongly identified as one of Australia's most-wanted criminals. He maintains his innocence.

Synopsis
The video shows an unnamed man being escorted by police out of a Chinese restaurant into a waiting police car. He is clearly agitated by this situation, and when told he is being placed under arrest he exclaims, "I am under what?" As police try to wrestle him into the car, the man says, "Gentlemen, this is democracy manifest". As the scuffle continues, he shouts, "Get your hand off my penis!" and then asks, "What is the charge? Eating a meal? A succulent Chinese meal?" As the police struggle to contain the man, he states, "Ah, yes. I see that you know your judo well." He is then forced into the car, feet-first, while asking someone inside the vehicle, "And you, sir, are you waiting to receive my limp penis?", and bidding bystanders "ta ta and farewell".

History
The video was taped by then-freshman reporter Chris Reason at Seven News. Reason's reporting said that the man was arrested in a case of mistaken identity ("the police thought they'd caught Queensland's most wanted"). Other later sources said he was a dine and dasher, or an international criminal, while officer Dean Biron who attended the scene recalled he was wanted on 19 counts of fraud and receiving stolen goods worth $70,000. The man involved gave his name as Cecil George Edwards, one of several aliases. The clip remained obscure until a raw video version was uploaded to the Internet in January 2009 when it became an immediate viral video.

The raw footage was missing Reason's voice-over explaining who the man was, or what the incident was about, and Internet speculation attempted to resolve the mystery. Theories about the man's identity centered on Paul Charles Dozsa, a Hungarian chess player and notorious dine and dasher, but there were also serious doubts about this theory. It was questioned as to why the arrest was filmed from so many angles, why it was filmed at all and why the allegedly-Hungarian man did not sound Hungarian. Friends, family and acquaintances of Dozsa also stated that the man in the video was not Dozsa. Other theories included that the man was politician John Bartlett, the video was a skit from an unidentified television show, or that the man was a real dine and dasher named Gregory John Ziegler.

The mystery of the man's identity continued until 2020, when Australian punk band The Chats published a music video titled "Dine 'N Dash" that re-created the viral video with an older man acting the part of the arrestee. The actor then identified himself in an interview with Sydney Morning Herald as Cecil George Edwards, the man in the viral video, now going by the name of "Jack K". Asked why he made such a show during the arrest, he said he wanted to appear crazy so he might be placed into an asylum where it would be easier to escape. It was also revealed he had an artistic career making paintings, including some of the arrest.

In 2020, "Jack K" was interviewed in a video titled "Democracy Manifest Guy Speaks". The interview includes the original Seven News archival footage of the event that was last broadcast to the public in 1990. In the broadcast footage, Reason's voice-over confirms his identity: "When Cecil George Edwards was arrested in a town mall last Friday, the Valley police thought they'd caught Queensland's most wanted."

Seven News interviewed the arrestee again in 2021, for a segment that included additional archival footage, revealing that other than Cecil George Edwards, the arrestee had also been known by the names of Johann Kelmut Karlson and Cecil Gerry Edwards.

The Radio National program Earshot broadcast an hour-long biographical documentary on the incident in January 2022. In June 2022, academic Dean Biron gave his account of the arrest after 31 years, as he was one of the arresting officers who was accused in the "Get your hands off my penis" part of the video; Biron corrected some misinformation such as the exact date, why the police were making the arrest, and that Edwards was not well known to police or considered a major case. Biron said after the arrest, Edwards was taken to jail then released on bail overnight. He then jumped bail and disappeared until his "15 minutes of fame" in 2020, "somehow scrubbed clean of that pesky past".

Influences
Since being uploaded to YouTube in 2009, the video has become a viral hit in Australian culture. When Australian activist Julian Assange was arrested at the Ecuadorian Embassy in London in 2019, comparisons were made between both respective arrests and "it didn't take long for Aussies to all make the same joke".

It has been the subject of an orchestral work composed by Michael Tan that was performed at the Sydney Opera House by Ensemble Apex.

Slipstream Brewing Company, a microbrewer in Yeerongpilly, Queensland, makes a beer named "Succulent Chinese Meal".

Mikkeller Brewpub London, a microbrewer in London, England, made a beer named "Democracy Manifest".

Mac Miller (under his production alias Larry Fisherman) sampled the video in his 2015 instrumental mixtape Run-On Sentences, Volume Two.

References

Notes

Citations

External links
Video of Edwards arrest
The Chats music Video with a reenactment of the Democracy Manifest video (5 March 2020)
Paul Charles Dozsa's Democracy Manifest Video, (April, 2019) Know Your Meme 
Mr. Democracy Manifest.  

Viral videos
Australian artists
2009 YouTube videos
Internet memes introduced in 2009